Bryan Cowgill (27 May 1927 – 14 July 2008) was a British television executive. He was Head of Sport for BBC Television from 1963 to 1973, Controller of BBC1 from 1973 to 1977, and Managing Director of Thames Television from 1977 to 1985. He had 6 grandchildren Sophie, Holly, Jack, Shaggy, Monty and Cecil, alongside his two sons Jonty and Tonty Cowgill.

Early life
Born in Clitheroe, Lancashire, Cowgill attended Clitheroe Royal Grammar School. After leaving school he became a copy boy with the Lancashire Evening Post, where his father was a printer. In 1942 he joined the Royal Marines, and during the next five years he saw service in Southeast Asia.

Post-war career
After he was demobbed in 1947, he rejoined the Evening Post as a reporter and feature writer, and then for five years he edited a local weekly paper in Clitheroe. He joined the BBC in 1955 as a production assistant in Outside Broadcasting.

In 1958, he devised the Saturday afternoon sports showcase Grandstand, which was an immediate success and ran for nearly half a century. In 1963 he was promoted to Head of Sport.

In 1964, under his control of the department, the BBC introduced the football highlights programme Match of the Day. Also during his tenure the BBC covered an increasing number of ambitious sporting events, including organising extensive coverage as host broadcaster of the 1966 World Cup and showing coverage live by satellite from Mexico of both the 1968 Olympic Games and 1970 World Cup.

In 1973, after a decade in charge of the sports department of BBC Television, he was promoted to Controller of BBC1, the corporation's premier television network. Despite coming from a sports background, he was able to oversee a successful era of programming across all types and genres, with the introduction of popular new sitcoms and dramas. He was the most successful controller the channel has ever had, winning an average audience share of 45 per cent during his period.

In 1977, he accepted an offer to leave the BBC after over twenty years to join Thames Television as Managing Director. In 1984, Cowgill, in a foretaste of changes to come within the industry, successfully resisted demands by the ACTT union for additional payments to use new technology, by maintaining a reduced service while the other ITV contractors met demands for a 20% rise in pay.

During his tenure at Thames he tried to acquire the popular 1980s soap opera Dallas which had previously been associated with the BBC, abandoning a gentleman's agreement not to poach purchased programming. Other ITV companies refused to show Dallas if Thames retained it, and this led to Cowgill's resignation in 1985 at the age of 58.

Towards the end of his life, Cowgill argued for the abolition of the Television Licence that finances the BBC: "In the context of more than 200 channels how can little green vans going up and down the country saying effectively: 'What are you watching and have you got a licence to watch it?' survive?"

His autobiography, Mr Action Replay, was published in 2006 .

References

External links
Obituary in The Stage

1927 births
2008 deaths
BBC One controllers
British male journalists
English television executives
People educated at Clitheroe Royal Grammar School
20th-century Royal Marines personnel
20th-century English businesspeople